Orba Co, also Wo Erba or Wo Erbacuo, is a lake in Rutog County in the Ngari Prefecture in the northwest of the Tibet Autonomous Region of China. The lake has islands, which are the highest islands in the world.

References

Ngari Prefecture
Lakes of Tibet